Hridoyer Kotha is a Bangladeshi film released on 18 October 2006 directed by S.A. Haque Alik. Riaz produced the movie, the first time in his career. Notable songs in the film include "Valobasbo Bashbo Re" (Habib Wahid) and "Jay Din Jay Ekaki" (S.I. Tutul).

Cast 
 Riaz – Anik
 Purnima – Adhora
 Tushar Khan
 Doli Johur – Adhora's mother
 Dr. Ejaj – Porter
 Nasrin
 Mannan Shafiq
 Moushumi
 Sakib Akash Khan - Sagor

Soundtrack 

The soundtrack for the film was conducted Alauddin Ali, with music directors Habib Wahid and S.I. Tutul.  Habib Wahid has sung "Bhalobasabo Basabore Bondhu" and S.I. Tutul has sung "Jay Din Jay Ekaki". Track listing for the soundtrack is adapted from Apple Music and Google Play.

Track listing

Awards
Meril Prothom Alo Awards
 Public Choice Awards for Best Film Actor - Riaz
 Public Choice Awards for Best Film Actress - Purnima
 Public Choice Awards for Best Singer (Male) - Habib Wahid (Bhalobasbo Basbore Bondhu)

See also 
 Akash Chhoa Bhalobasa

References

Further reading

External links 
 

Bengali-language Bangladeshi films
2006 films
Films scored by Habib Wahid
Films scored by S I Tutul
2000s Bengali-language films
Best Film Bachsas Award winners